Slough Hockey Club is a field hockey club established in 1921 and now based at Upton Park, Upton Road in Slough, Berkshire, England.

The ladies 1st XI play in the Women's England Hockey League. The club fields men's, ladies and age group youth sides.

The club is historically the most successful in England with six Men's Championships, eleven Women's Championships, four Men's National Cup wins and six Women's National Cup wins.

Major National Honours
National League
 1975–76 Men's League Champions
 1979–80 Men's League Champions
 1980–81 Men's League Champions
 1981–82 Men's League Champions
 1982–83 Men's League Champions
 1986–87 Men's League Champions
 1989–90 Women's League Champions
 1990-91 Women's League Champions
 1991-92 Women's League Champions
 1994-95 Women's League Champions
 1996-97 Women's League Champions
 1997-98 Women's League Champions
 1998-99 Women's League Champions
 2001-02 Women's League Champions
 2002-03 Women's League Champions
 2007-08 Women's League Champions
 2009-10 Women's League Champions

National Cup
 1976-77 Men's National Cup Winners
 1978–79 Men's National Cup Winners
 1979–80 Men's National Cup Winners
 1980-81 Men's National Cup Winners
 1981-82 Women's National Cup Winners
 1982–83 Women's National Cup Winners
 1985–86 Women's National Cup Winners
 1993-94 Women's National Cup Winners
 1998-99 Women's National Cup Winners
 2000-01 Women's National Cup Winners

National Tournaments
 1998-99 Women's Premiership Tournament Winners
 2000-01 Women's Premiership Tournament Winners
 2002-03 Women's Premiership Tournament Winners

Notable players

Men's internationals

Women's internationals

References

English field hockey clubs
Sport in Slough